Idle Race is the second album by the Idle Race, the follow-up to the band's debut, The Birthday Party.

Released in 1969, this record was the first to be produced by Jeff Lynne. After this album failed to chart, Lynne accepted Roy Wood's invitation to join fellow Birmingham band the Move.

Track listing
All tracks composed by Jeff Lynne; except where indicated
"Come with Me" - 2:45 (rechanneled to simulate stereo)
"Sea of Dreams" - 3:13
"Going Home" - 3:44
"Reminds Me of You" (Dave Pritchard) - 2:54 
"Mr. Crow and Sir Norman" - 3:17
"Please No More Sad Songs" - 3:20
"Girl at the Window" - 3:44
"Big Chief Woolly Bosher" - 5:15
"Someone Knocking" (Dave Pritchard) - 2:56 
"A Better Life (The Weatherman Knows)" - 2:45
"Hurry Up John" - 3:33

Personnel
Idle Race
Jeff Lynne - vocals, guitar, piano 
Dave Pritchard - guitar, vocals
Greg Masters - bass guitar, vocals
Roger Spencer - drums, vocals

References

The Idle Race albums
1969 albums
Albums produced by Jeff Lynne
Liberty Records albums
Albums recorded at Trident Studios